The Vitoria-Gasteiz tram is a tram system in Vitoria-Gasteiz, Basque Country, Spain. It is operated by Euskotren under the brand Euskotren Tranbia (which also manages the tram system in Bilbao). Inaugurated on 23 December 2008, it comprises two lines totaling .

System

Station design 
The whole line has twenty-three stations (as of May 2021). All tram stops have low platforms, are un-staffed and have automated ticket machines for ticket sales. Once bought, the ticket must be validated on the validation machine located next to the ticket machine. The floor of the stations are virtually in level with the one of the trams, so this allows wheelchairs, prams, pushchairs and the elderly to board the tram easily with no steps.

In 2019, due to the introduction of the longer 600 series trams; all stops had their platforms lengthened, with the exception of Parlamento/Legebiltzarra (due to space constrains). Therefore, 600 series trams don't open their front and rear doors when stopping there.

Lines 

The network comprises two unnumbered lines, running from Ibaindo to Unibertsitatea and from Abetxuko to Florida. Both lines share a common trunk in the city center before branching towards the outskirts (roughly on an "Y" shape). On weekdays, the first departure from Ibaiondo is at 6:00, from Unibertsitatea at 6:26, from  Abetxuko at 6:06 and from Florida at 6:26. Trams run every 15 minutes during the day on each line, and every 7.5 minutes on their shared stretch. The last departure from Ibaiondo is at 22:45, from Unibertsitatea at 23:11, from  Abetxuko at 22:34 and from Florida at 23:06. Weekend service has shorter hours of operation.

The two lines are not numbered. Instead, each terminus is given a color and a number of dots: Unibertsitatea red-1, Ibaiondo green-2, Abetxuko white-3 and Florida 4-blue. The indicators (called Minutran) mounted on top of the shelters show the time remaining for the next departures together with the number of dots and color corresponding to their destinations.

Stop list

Network map

See also 
 TUVISA

References

External links 
 
 

Rail transport in the Basque Country (autonomous community)
Tram transport in Spain
Metre gauge railways in Spain
Euskotren
Vitoria-Gasteiz
2008 establishments in Spain
Railway lines opened in 2008